Panicarola is a frazione of the comune of Castiglione del Lago in the Province of Perugia, Umbria, central Italy. It stands at an elevation of 269 metres above sea level. At the time of the Istat census of 2001 it had 760 inhabitants.

References 

Frazioni of Castiglione del Lago